David S. Baskin is a neurosurgeon who currently works at Houston Methodist Hospital as the Vice Chairman of the Department of Neurosurgery, the Director of the Residency Training program, and the Director of the Kenneth R. Peak Brain & Pituitary Tumor Center, and is also a professor of neurosurgery at Weill Cornell Medical College.

Education
Baskin has a bachelor's degree from Swarthmore College, where he graduated with high honors, and a medical degree from Mount Sinai School of Medicine. He completed his residency in neurosurgery at the University of California, San Francisco.

Career
Baskin taught neurological surgery at Baylor College of Medicine from 1984 until 2005.  In 2011, he published a clinical trial in the Journal of Clinical Oncology regarding the efficacy of a type of gene therapy for malignant glioma, the most common form of brain tumor. This trial concluded that the therapy was safe and that the survival trends were "encouraging." He became the director of the Peak Center upon its establishment in 2013. In 2014, Baskin and his team conducted research regarding the use of nanosyringes to treat glioblastoma by filling them with anticancer drugs and releasing them into the bloodstream.

Baskin has conducted research in which human neurons and fibroblasts are exposed to low levels of thimerosal, and has concluded that thimerosal causes membrane and DNA damage, as well as caspase-3-dependent apoptosis. Some of this research was funded by Autism Speaks. Baskin testified before the Committee on Government Reform that ethylmercury is possibly more toxic than methylmercury. He also conducted research that demonstrates that cells from children with autism are more sensitive to environmental toxins than cells from age and sex matched controls.

Baskin has won the American Academy of Neurosurgery Award; the American College of Surgeons' Smith, Kline & French fellowship; the Wakeman Award for Research in the Neurosciences; and a distinguished alumni award from Mount Sinai School of Medicine. In 2000, he was elected to The Society of Neurological Surgeons.

References

External links
David Baskin at Google Scholar

Swarthmore College alumni
Living people
American neurosurgeons
Baylor University faculty
Icahn School of Medicine at Mount Sinai alumni
Vaccinologists
Year of birth missing (living people)
Thiomersal and vaccines